Richard Mead-Briggs (25 March 1902 – 15 May 1956) was an English cricketer.  Mead-Briggs was a right-handed batsman who bowled right-arm medium-fast.  He was born at Canterbury, Kent.

Mead-Briggs made two first-class appearances for Warwickshire against Sussex and Leicestershire in the 1946 County Championship.  Against Sussex, Mead-Briggs bowled 14 wicketless overs in Sussex's first-innings total of 224.  He was dismissed for 2 runs in Warwickshire's first-innings of 237 by Edward Harrison.  The match ended in a draw.  Against Leicestershire, he ended not out on 44 in Warwickshire's first-innings total of 368, while in Leicestershire's first-innings he took what would be his only first-class wicket when he dismissed Vic Jackson, finishing with figures of 1/44 from 21 overs.  He wasn't required to bat in Warwickshire's second-innings and in Leicestershire's second-innings he bowled 5 wicketless overs, with Warwickshire winning by 229 runs.  These were his only major appearances for Warwickshire.

He died at Harborne, Warwickshire on 15 May 1956.

References

External links
Richard Mead-Briggs at ESPNcricinfo
Richard Mead-Briggs at CricketArchive

1902 births
1956 deaths
Sportspeople from Canterbury
English cricketers
Warwickshire cricketers